2,3,3-Trimethylpentane is a chemical compound in the family of hydrocarbons which has a formula of C8H18. It is an isomer of octane.

References

Alkanes